Hungarian Rhapsody: Queen Live in Budapest is a concert film of the British rock band Queen's performance at the Népstadion in Budapest on 27 July 1986. It was part of the band's final tour with original lead singer Freddie Mercury, The Magic Tour. Queen were one of the few bands from Western Europe to perform in the Eastern Bloc during the Cold War. The film had a limited theatrical release in Eastern Bloc countries in 1987/1988 and worldwide on 20 September 2012. The concert was released on VHS and Laserdisc in the UK and Japan on 16 February 1987 under the original title Queen Live In Budapest, and on DVD and Blu-ray for the first time on 5 November 2012 worldwide, except in the United States where it was released a day later. The concert title is a play on the Hungarian Rhapsodies by Franz Liszt and one of Queen's most celebrated hits, "Bohemian Rhapsody".

Band members
Freddie Mercury - lead vocals, piano, electric guitar on "Crazy Little Thing Called Love"
Brian May - acoustic and electric guitars, keyboard on "Who Wants to Live Forever", backing vocals
Roger Taylor - drums, tambourine, co-lead vocals on "Under Pressure", backing vocals
John Deacon - bass guitar, backing vocals

Additional musicians:
Spike Edney - keyboards, piano, rhythm guitar on "Hammer to Fall", backing vocals

VHS, Laserdisc, DVD & Blu-ray
 "One Vision" (Queen)
 "Tie Your Mother Down" (Brian May)
 "In the Lap of the Gods... Revisited" (Freddie Mercury)
 "Seven Seas of Rhye" (Mercury)
 "Tear It Up" (May)
 "A Kind of Magic" (Roger Taylor)
 "Under Pressure" (Queen, David Bowie)
 "Who Wants to Live Forever" (May)
 "I Want to Break Free" (John Deacon)
 "Guitar Solo" (May)
 "Now I'm Here" (May)
 "Love of My Life" (Mercury)
 "Tavaszi Szél Vizet Áraszt" (Traditional)
 "Is This the World We Created...?" (Mercury, May)
 "Tutti Frutti" (Richard Penniman, Dorothy LaBostrie, Joe Lubin)
 "Bohemian Rhapsody" (Mercury)
 "Hammer to Fall" (May)
 "Crazy Little Thing Called Love" (Mercury)
 "Radio Ga Ga" (Taylor)
 "We Will Rock You" (May)
 "Friends Will Be Friends" (Mercury, Deacon)
 "We Are the Champions" (Mercury)
"God Save the Queen" (End credits) (Traditional, arr. May)

 Extras
A Magic Year Documentary (DVD and Blu-ray only)

CD version

Disc one
 "One Vision" (Queen)
 "Tie Your Mother Down" (edited on DVD and Blu-ray) (May)
 "In the Lap of the Gods... Revisited" (Mercury)
 "Seven Seas of Rhye" (Mercury)
 "Tear It Up" (May)
 "A Kind of Magic" (Taylor)
 "Under Pressure" (Queen, Bowie)
 "Another One Bites the Dust" (omitted on DVD and Blu-ray) (Deacon)
 "Who Wants to Live Forever" (May)
 "I Want to Break Free" (edited on DVD and Blu-ray) (Deacon)
 "Looks Like It's Gonna Be a Good Night" (omitted on DVD and Blu-ray) (Queen)
 "Guitar Solo" (edited on DVD and Blu-ray) (May)
 "Now I'm Here" (May)

Disc two
 "Love of My Life" (edited on DVD and Blu-ray) (Mercury)
 "Tavaszi Szél Vizet Áraszt" (Traditional)
 "Is This the World We Created...?" (Mercury, May)
 "(You're So Square) Baby I Don't Care" (omitted on DVD and Blu-ray) (Jerry Leiber and Mike Stoller)
 "Hello Mary Lou" (omitted on DVD and Blu-ray) (Gene Pitney)
 "Tutti Frutti" (edited on DVD and Blu-ray) (Penniman, LaBostrie, Lubin)
 "Bohemian Rhapsody" (Mercury)
 "Hammer to Fall" (May)
 "Crazy Little Thing Called Love" (edited on DVD and Blu-ray) (Mercury)
 "Radio Ga Ga" (Taylor)
 "We Will Rock You" (May)
 "Friends Will Be Friends" (Mercury, Deacon)
 "We Are the Champions" (Mercury)
 "God Save the Queen" (Traditional, arr. May)

Charts

DVD

Album

Certifications

References

External links
Hungarian Rhapsody: Latest Worldwide Cinema Listings

2012 films
Concert films
2012 live albums
Films shot in Budapest
Hollywood Records video albums
Queen (band) live albums
2010s English-language films